Cho Sung-man (Korean: 조성만) is a South Korean national team coach. He has coached skaters like Park Bit-na, Kim Na-young, Park Yun-joon in Korean national competition and international competition.
He is currently coaching and serving as Director of Incheon Skating Federation. Also, he has developed cultural skating exchange program with East West Palace Ice in Artesia, CA. Also, he is working with high level coaches such as Jean Yun, Peter Oppegard, and Karen Kwan-Oppegard from East West Palace Ice to promote Korean skater to learn and advance their ice skating skills.

References

South Korean sports coaches
Living people
Year of birth missing (living people)